The eulacheon ( (Thaleichthys pacificus), also spelled oolichan , ooligan , hooligan ), also called the candlefish, is a small anadromous species of smelt that spawns in some of the major river systems along the Pacific coast of North America from northern California to Alaska.

Etymology
The name "candlefish" derives from it being so fatty during spawning, with up to 15% of the total body weight in fat, that if caught, dried, and strung on a wick, it can be burned as a candle. This is the name most often used by early explorers. The name eulacheon (occasionally seen as ooolichan, ooligan, oulachon, and uthlecan) is from the Chinookan language and the Chinook Jargon based on that language. One of several theories for the origin of the name of the state of Oregon is that it was a corruption from the term "Ooolichan Trail", the native trade route for ooolichan oil.

The unrelated sablefish Anoplopoma fimbria is also called "candlefish" in the United Kingdom.

Species description

Eulacheon are distinguished by the large canine like teeth on the vomer bone and 19 to 31 rays in the anal fin or butt fin. Like salmon and trout they have an adipose fin (aft of the dorsal); it is sickle-shaped. The paired fins are longer in male fish than in females. All fins have well-developed breeding parts (raised tissue "bumps") in ripe males, but these are poorly developed or absent in females. Adult coloration is red to blue on the back and top of the head, lighter to silvery white or light blue on the sides, and white on the ventral surface; speckling is extra fine, sparse, and restricted to the back. Adults can reach maximum lengths of  but most adults are between   They feed on plankton but only while at sea.

Ecology
Eulacheon feed primarily on plankton as well as fish eggs, insect larvae, ocean debris and small crustaceans. It forms an important part of the diet of many ocean and shore predators, and serves as a prominent food source for people living near its spawning streams.

Eulacheon, as anadromous fish, spend most of their adult lives in the ocean but return to their natal freshwater streams and rivers to spawn and die  As such, one stream may see regular large runs of eulachon while a neighboring stream sees few or none at all. Regular annual runs are common but not entirely predictable, and occasionally a river which has large runs sees a year with no returns; the reasons for such variability are not known. The eulachon run is characteristic for the early portion being almost entirely male, with females following about midway through the run to its conclusion. Males are easily distinguished from females during spawning by fleshy ridges which form along the length of their bodies.

Economics and trade

Indigenous communities of the Pacific Coast from California to Alaska made eulachon an important part of their diet, as well as a valuable trade item with peoples whose territories did not include spawning rivers. The species was caught using traps, rakes, and nets. The harvest continues today, with other residents taking part in the exploitation of the large runs. Today harvested eulachon are typically stored frozen and thawed as needed. They may also be dried, smoked, or canned. Eulachon were also processed for their rich oil. The usual process was to allow the fish to decompose (rot) for a week or more in a hole in the ground, then add boiling hot water and skim off the oil, which would rise to the surface, being less dense than water. Eulacheon oil (also known as "Eulacheon grease") was the most important product traded with inland communities; as a result, the trails over which the trade was conducted came to be known as grease trails. Other uses of eulacheon by non-Natives include bait for sportfishing and food for cats and dogs.

Conservation status
In November 2008, the National Marine Fisheries Service (NMFS) received a petition from the Cowlitz Tribe to list a distinct population segment (DPS) of eulachon from Washington, Oregon, and California, (the so-called Southern DPS) as an endangered or threatened species under the Endangered Species Act. (ESA). NMFS found that this petition presented enough information to warrant conducting a status review of the species. Based on the status review NMFS proposed listing this species as threatened on March 13, 2009.   On March 16, 2010, NOAA announced that the Southern DPS of eulachon will be listed as threatened under the ESA, effective on May 17, 2010 (See: the Federal Register notice published on May 18, 2010, at 74 FR 3178). On September 6, 2017, the NMFS approved a recovery plan intended to serve as a blueprint for the protection and recovery of the southern Distinct Population Segment (DPS) of eulachon (Thaleichthys pacificus) using the best available science per the requirements of the Endangered Species Act.

References

The First Sign of Spring: OOLIGAN
National Marine Fisheries Service eulachon webpage

External links
FishBase entry for Thaleichthys pacificus
Preserving the Tradition of T'lina Making - Virtual Museum Exhibit of Kwakwaka'wakw eulachon oil production
Central Coast First Nation preserves eulachon grease tradition as the fish returns to Bella Coola River, Audrey McKinnon, CBC News, June 27, 2018, last opened Febr. 13, 2022
Sinumwack: Bella Coola Oolichan Run (UBCIC, 1978)
Watch a Fish Transform From Animal to Candle, National Geographic on YouTube, last opened Febr. 13, 2022

First Nations culture
Fish of the Pacific Ocean
Native American culture
Osmeridae
Marine fish genera
Taxa named by Charles Frédéric Girard
Fish described in 1836